Events from the year 1552 in art.

Events
date unknown – Spanish sculptor and architect Alonso Berruguete begins work on the hospital of St. John the Baptist in Toledo.

Paintings

 Christoph Amberger – Portrait of Sebastian Münster
 Bronzino – Portrait of the Dwarf Nano Morgante
 Dirck Jacobsz. – A Group of Guardsmen
 Hans Mielich – Duke Albrecht V of Bavaria and his wife Anna of Austria playing chess
 Tintoretto – The Vision of St. Peter
 Giorgio Vasari – Allegory of Patience

Other works
Altarpiece of the Iglesia de San Juan Bautista (Chiclana de la Frontera) by Roque Balduque and Andrés Ramírez
Pierino da Vinci – Samson Slaying a Philistine (sculpture - ca.)

Births
August 24 (bapt.) – Lavinia Fontana, Italian painter (died 1614)
September 21 – Barbara Longhi, Italian painter (died 1638)
date unknown
Hans von Aachen, German Mannerist painter (died 1615)
Alessandro Casolano, Italian painter primarily working in Siena (died 1606)
Daniël van den Queborn, Dutch Golden Age painter (died 1602)
Emanuel Sweert, Dutch painter (died 1612)
probable
Avanzino Nucci, Italian painter (died 1629)
Cristoforo Roncalli, Italian painter (died 1626)

Deaths
July 12 – Niccolò Soggi, Italian painter (born c.1480)
date unknown
Amico Aspertini, early leader of the Bolognese School of painting (born c.1474)
Peter Dell the Elder, German sculptor (born 1490)
Lucas Cornelisz de Kock, Dutch painter at the Tudor court (born 1495)
Giovanni Antonio Lappoli, Italian Mannerist painter (born 1492)
Qiu Ying, Chinese painter who specialized in the gongbi brush technique (born 1494)
Wilhelm Stetter, German Renaissance painter (born 1487)

References

 
Years of the 16th century in art